Holly Keller (born 1942) is an American writer and illustrator of children's books.

Background
Holly Keller is an author and illustrator, who is noted for her penchant for creating animal protagonists, which she draws in a minimalist, flat, cartoon style.

Schooling
Keller was born in New York City in 1942, and was a fan of reading from an early age. Drawing also quickly became a form of self entertainment for her. As schooling for Keller continued she went on to Sarah Lawrence College to obtain a degree in history; later attending Columbia University, Keller continued her history studies by earning her master's degree. Holly took courses at the Parsons School of Design when she finally had time and was encouraged by a professor to try illustrating children's books. In 1981, Keller put together a portfolio of her works and submitted it to an editor at the Greenwillow Press which was where she was published using her first two books and illustrations; Cromwell's Glasses and Ten Sleepy Sheep.

Family
Keller married in 1963 to a pediatrician and soon became the mother of two children.

About the books
Keller has gotten many recognitions and awards for her books. She draws with a flat, minimalist and cartoon style. Keller's books are not only entertaining to read, but they also have a message. Some books deal with issues ranging from adoption to fitting in, from sibling relationships to saying farewell to a beloved pet. Keller's Ten Sleepy Sheep was voted a Library of Congress Children's Book of the Year which was a big step for her since it was only her second published children's book.,In 1986 Keller won  the Caldecott Honor "When Francie Was Sick" and 1987 "Snow is Falling". Keller was not only known for her books featuring wonderful characters taking on real-life tasks but also has many standalone picture-books that also tell life-relating stories. Not only does Holly Keller write and illustrate her own picture books but she also creates artwork for stories by other writers, such as Paul Showers, Wendy Pfeffer and Anne Rockwood.

Awards
 Children's Book of the Year, Library of Congress, 1983, for Ten Sleepy Sheep
 Best Book of the Year, School Library Journal, 1984, for Geraldine's Blanket
 Caldecott Honor Book, 1986 1987 for When Francie Was Sick and Snow Is Falling
 Children's Choice and Child Study Association Children's Book of the Year, both 1987, both for Goodbye, Max
 Notable Children's Trade Book in the Field of Social Studies, National Council for the Social Studies/Children's Book Council (NCSS/CBC), 1989, for The Best Present
 Fanfare Honor Book, Horn Book, 1991, for Horace
 Reading Rainbow Review Book, 1991, for Horace
 Pick of the Lists, American Booksellers Association, 1991, for The New Boy
 Pick of the Lists, American Booksellers Association, 1992, for Island Baby
 Pick of the Lists, American Booksellers Association, 1994, for Geraldine's Baby Brother
 Notable Children's Trade Book in the Field of Social Studies, NCSS/CBC, 1994, for Grandfather's Dream
 Charlotte Zolotow Award for Farfallina & Marcel, 2003

Books  
For Children; Self-Illustrated

 Cromwell's Glasses, Greenwillow (New York, NY), 1982.
 Ten Sleepy Sheep, Greenwillow (New York, NY), 1983.
 Too Big, Greenwillow (New York, NY), 1983.
 Geraldine's Blanket, Greenwillow (New York, NY), 1984.
 Will It Rain?, Greenwillow (New York, NY), 1984.
 Henry's Fourth of July, Greenwillow (New York, NY), 1985.
 When Francie Was Sick, Greenwillow (New York, NY), 1985.
 A Bear for Christmas, Greenwillow (New York, NY), 1986.
 Lizzie's Invitation, Greenwillow (New York, NY), 1987.
 Goodbye, Max, Greenwillow (New York, NY), 1987.
 Geraldine's Big Snow, Greenwillow (New York, NY), 1988.
 Maxine in the Middle, Greenwillow (New York, NY), 1989.
 The Best Present, Greenwillow (New York, NY), 1989.
 Henry's Happy Birthday, Greenwillow (New York, NY), 1990.
 What Alvin Wanted, Greenwillow (New York, NY), 1990.
 Horace, Greenwillow (New York, NY), 1991.
 The New Boy, Greenwillow (New York, NY), 1991.
 Furry, Greenwillow (New York, NY), 1992.
 Island Baby, Greenwillow (New York, NY), 1992.
 Harry and Tuck, Greenwillow (New York, NY), 1993.
 Grandfather's Dream, Greenwillow (New York, NY), 1994.
 Geraldine's Baby Brother, Greenwillow (New York, NY), 1994.
 Rosata, Greenwillow (New York, NY), 1995.
 Geraldine First, Greenwillow (New York, NY), 1996.
 I Am Angela, Greenwillow (New York, NY), 1997.
 Merry Christmas, Geraldine, Greenwillow (New York, NY), 1997.
 Angela's Top-Secret Computer Club, Greenwillow (New York, NY), 1998.
 Brave Horace, Greenwillow (New York, NY), 1998.
 Jacob's Tree, Greenwillow (New York, NY), 1999.
 What I See, Harcourt Brace (New York, NY), 1999.
 A Bed Full of Cats, Harcourt Brace (New York, NY), 1999.
 That's Mine, Horace, Greenwillow (New York, NY), 2000.
 Geraldine and Mrs. Duffy, Greenwillow (New York, NY), 2000.
 Cecil's Garden, Greenwillow (New York, NY), 2002.
 Farfallina and Marcel, Greenwillow (New York, NY), 2002.
 What a Hat!, Greenwillow (New York, NY), 2003.
 The Hat, Harcourt (Orlando, FL), 2005.
 Pearl's New Skates, Greenwillow (New York, NY), 2005.
 Sophie's Window, Greenwillow (New York, NY), 2005.
 Fafallina & Marcel, 2005.
 Nosy Rosie, 2006.
 Help, 2007.
 The Van, 2008.
 Miranda's Beach Day, 2009.

For Children; Illustrator

 Jane Thayer, Clever Raccoon, Morrow (New York, NY), 1981.
 Melvin Berger, Why I Cough, Sneeze, Shiver, Hiccup, and Yawn, Crowell (New York, NY), 1983.
 Roma Gans, Rock Collecting, Crowell (New York, NY), 1984.
 Franklyn Mansfield Branley, Snow Is Falling, Crowell (New York, NY), 1986.
 Franklyn Mansfield Branley, Air Is All around You, Harper & Row (New York, NY), 1986, revised edition, Crowell (New York, NY), 1986.
 Patricia Lauber, Snakes Are Hunters, Crowell (New York, NY), 1988.
 Franklyn Mansfield Branley, Shooting Stars, Crowell (New York, NY), 1989.
 Patricia Lauber, An Octopus Is Amazing, Crowell (New York, NY), 1990.
 Paul Showers, Ears Are for Hearing, Crowell (New York, NY), 1990.
 Barbara Juster Ebensen, Sponges Are Skeletons, HarperCollins (New York, NY), 1993.
 Patricia Lauber, Be a Friend to Trees, HarperCollins (New York, NY), 1994.
 Wendy Pfeffer, From Tadpole to Frog, HarperCollins (New York, NY), 1994.
 Patricia Lauber, Who Eats What?: Food Chains and FoodWebs, HarperCollins (New York, NY), 1995.
 Patricia Lauber, You're Aboard Spaceship Earth, HarperCollins (New York, NY), 1996.
 Wendy Pfeffer, What's It Like to Be a Fish?, HarperCollins (New York, NY), 1996.
 Stuart J. Murphy, The Best Bug Parade, HarperCollins (New York, NY), 1996.
 Roma Gans, Let's Go Rock Collecting, HarperCollins (New York, NY), 1997.
 Nola Buck, Morning in the Meadow, HarperCollins (New York, NY), 1997.
 Wendy Pfeffer, Sounds All Around, HarperCollins (New York, NY), 1999.
 Franklyn Mansfield Branley, Snow Is Falling, revised edition, HarperCollins (New York, NY), 1999.
 Anne Rockwell, Growing like Me, Silver Whistle (San Diego, CA), 2001.
 Paul Showers, Hear Your Heart, HarperCollins (New York, NY), 2001.

References

External links

 

1942 births
American children's book illustrators
American children's writers
Living people
Date of birth missing (living people)